Factory 25 is a Brooklyn-based independent film distribution and production company, founded by Matt Grady in 2009.

History
Grady founded Factory 25 in 2009 after leaving a position as director of production at Plexifilm.  The name Factory 25 is from "the manufacturing home of the famous 1909 Honus Wagner tobacco card".

The company's first release, Frownland, was the film that inspired Grady to create his own distribution company, as he believed no other company would distribute the film.

, Grady remained the company's sole employee.

Releases

The films that Factory 25 produces and distributes are often microbudget features with nontraditional narratives. Factory 25 largely focuses on physical releases such as DVDs, Blu-Rays, VHS Tapes, CDs and Vinyl LPs.  , a typical production run consisted of 1,000 DVD-LP pairs (movie and soundtrack), where sale of 40% of the production run would be the break-even point.  The company's physical releases often include objects such as 16mm film strips, drawings and written essays.  Matt Grady has expressed a desire to make the company's physical releases collectible and appealing, "like a fetish item". The company has worked and distributed films alongside notable distribution companies such as Oscilloscope Laboratories and streaming services such as Fandor.

Filmography

Distributed By Factory 25:

Produced By Factory 25:

Music Releases

Accolades
Factory 25 was named "Best Distributor" by The L Magazine in their "Best of Brooklyn 2013: Film" article.

References

Further reading 

 Founder Grady appears on this list: 
Founder Grady presenting at SXSW 2016:

Interviews

External links 

 Factory 25 Website FACTORY 25 - Home

American companies established in 2009
Entertainment companies established in 2009